Stade Lumumba is a stadium located in Kisangani, Democratic Republic of the Congo.  It has a capacity of 10,000 spectators for football matches.  It serves as the home of AS Nika, TS Malekesa and AS Makiso of the Linafoot.

References

External links
A peine réhabilité, le stade Lumumba de Kisangani se détériore à nouveau Kisangani, L'Avenir 6/06/2008

Football venues in the Democratic Republic of the Congo